Ty Shannon Brodie (born 2 October 1966) is an Antigua and Barbuda windsurfer. He competed in the men's Lechner A-390 event at the 1992 Summer Olympics.

References

External links
 

1966 births
Living people
Antigua and Barbuda male sailors (sport)
Antigua and Barbuda windsurfers
Antigua and Barbuda people of British descent
Olympic sailors of Antigua and Barbuda
Sailors at the 1992 Summer Olympics – Lechner A-390
Place of birth missing (living people)